Thomas Lake is a lake in the U.S. state of Wisconsin.

A variant name is "Lake Thomas". The lake most likely is named after Thomas Clements, a local landowner.

References

Lakes of Wisconsin
Bodies of water of Portage County, Wisconsin